Normanby station is a demolished station on the Exhibition line in Brisbane.

History 
Normanby opened on August 3, 1882, as an original station on the line between Roma Street, Mayne and Sandgate. A direct line was opened to Central on August 18, 1889, then to Mayne on November 1st, 1890.

The service between Exhibition and Mayne was withdrawn in 1900 although the track remained in place. Passenger and goods services continued between Roma Street, Normanby, and Exhibition. In August 1911, the service between Exhibition and Mayne was restored.

Normanby closed in 1966.

Between 1885 and 1961, there was also a station known as Normanby on the Cooktown Railway.

References

Disused railway stations in Brisbane